Union Square is a square in the Allston neighborhood of Boston, Massachusetts at the intersection of Cambridge Street and Brighton Avenue/North Beacon Street.  Union Square is serviced by the MBTA 57, 64, 66, 501, and 503 buses. There is also a station for the Blue Bikes bicycle sharing system in Union Square.

References

Neighborhoods in Boston